Mark Richardson (born 3 October 1986 in Swindon) is a British professional ice hockey player currently signed to and captain of the Cardiff Devils of the UK's EIHL. Richardson also plays internationally for Great Britain, reaching 100 caps at the 2022 IIHF World Championship. He is the younger brother of Lee Richardson who also played ice hockey at a professional level.

Richardson began his career with his hometown team the Swindon Lynx. In 2003, Richardson moved to the Bracknell Bees in a two-year spell.  Richardson's good performances during the 2004–05 season, which included nine goals and 18 assists for 27 points, saw him move to the Elite League for the Cardiff Devils.  His first season of 10 points in 30 games was impressive for an Elite League rookie, but his second season saw him collect 33 points, including 24 assists in 54 games.

Richardson moved to the Nottingham Panthers in 2007, in what was a slightly disappointing season for him, but still managed to collect 20 points in 46 games.  In 2008, Richardson signed with the Basingstoke Bison. Shortly after the end of the 2008–09 season, with Basingstoke dropping out of the Elite League, Richardson re-signed for the Cardiff Devils as a defenceman.

He moved briefly to Kazakhstan to sign for Arlan Kokshetau before re-joining Cardiff in 2012. He remained with Cardiff until 2020 but left the Elite League side over ongoing uncertainty about whether the 2020-21 Elite League season would go ahead.

On 8 September 2020, Richardson moved abroad for a second time, signing a one-year deal with German DEL2 team EC Bad Nauheim. The expectation is Richardson will return to Cardiff in 2021.

In July 2021, the Cardiff Devils announced Richardson had signed terms for the 2021–22 season. He was named Cardiff captain in August 2021.

References

External links

1986 births
Basingstoke Bison players
Bracknell Bees players
Cardiff Devils players
Arlan Kokshetau players
Rote Teufel Bad Nauheim players
English ice hockey defencemen
Living people
Nottingham Panthers players
Sportspeople from Swindon
British expatriate ice hockey people
English expatriate sportspeople in Kazakhstan
English expatriate sportspeople in Germany
Expatriate ice hockey players in Germany
Expatriate ice hockey players in Kazakhstan